Horsey Mere is one of the Norfolk Broads in the east of England; it is one of the more northerly broads close to the North Sea coast.

It is reached by Hickling Broad and the River Thurne. The nearest settlements are Horsey and West Somerton.

Horsey Mere is part of Upper Thurne Broads and Marshes, a Site of Special Scientific Interest. The mere is owned by the National Trust, as is Horsey Windpump.

Horsey Open Regatta

A regatta open to all broads craft is held on the mere each summer. There are various informal race fixtures, all are open to private and hire craft.

Winter waterbirds refuge

Between the start of November and the end of February boat access on the mere is limited to navigation between the end of 
Meadow Dyke and the Staithe.

Gallery

References

External links 
Brief details

Norfolk Broads
National Trust properties in Norfolk